Karin Yvonne Irene Jansen Adelmund (18 March 1949 – 21 October 2005) was a Dutch politician of the Labour Party (PvdA) and trade union leader.

Early life and education 
Karin Yvonne Irene Jansen Adelmund was born on 18 March 1949 in Rotterdam in the Netherlands. She was the daughter of Fritz Jansen Adelmund and Anna van der Hoven. She had two brothers and three sisters.

She went to Protestant primary and secondary schools in Rotterdam. She then studied at the Public Social Academy (1968–1972) in Rotterdam and she studied social sciences at the University of Amsterdam (1972–1979) in Amsterdam.

Career 
Adelmund was a member of the Dutch Labour Party (PvdA). She was a member of the Dutch House of Representatives (1994–1998), chairwoman of the Labour Party (1997–1998), State Secretary of Education, Culture and Science (1998–2002), and again member of the House of Representatives (2002–2005) until her death. She died on 21 October 2005, at the age 56, in Amsterdam.

References

External links

Official
  Drs. K.Y.I.J. (Karin) Adelmund Parlement & Politiek

 

1949 births
2005 deaths
Chairmen of the Labour Party (Netherlands)
Dutch trade union leaders
Labour Party (Netherlands) politicians
Members of the House of Representatives (Netherlands)
Officers of the Order of Orange-Nassau
Trade unionists from Amsterdam
Politicians from Rotterdam
State Secretaries for Education of the Netherlands
University of Amsterdam alumni
20th-century Dutch women politicians
20th-century Dutch politicians
21st-century Dutch women politicians
21st-century Dutch politicians